The Network of Aquaculture Centres in Asia-Pacific (NACA) was formed by International treaty titled Agreement on the Network of Aquaculture Centres in Asia and the Pacific signed in Bangkok on 8 January 1988.

The purpose of the NACA is the recognition of the importance of fisheries in the Asia Pacific region, that aquaculture plays a vital role in the promotion and better use of fishery resources and that the maintenance of a network of aquaculture centres in the region can make a significant contribution to the development of aquaculture. The network is based in Kasetsart University, Bangkok.

The network
The government members of the NACA governing council, and participating research and development (R&D) institutions are:

Associate member organisations are:
Asia-Pacific Association of Agricultural Research Institutions
Network of Aquaculture Centres in Central and Eastern Europe
Secretariat of the Pacific Community

References

Intergovernmental organizations established by treaty
Treaties of Australia
Treaties of Bangladesh
Treaties of Cambodia
Treaties of China
Treaties of Hong Kong
Treaties of India
Treaties of Indonesia
Treaties of Iran
Treaties of Laos
Treaties of Malaysia
Treaties of the Maldives
Treaties of Myanmar
Treaties of Nepal
Treaties of Pakistan
Treaties of the Philippines
International organizations based in Thailand